The Life of Pi'erre 5 is the second studio album by American record producer and rapper Pi'erre Bourne. It was released on June 11, 2021, by SossHouse Records and Interscope Records. The album features Playboi Carti, Lil Uzi Vert, and Sharc. It is the final album in The Life of Pi'erre series.

Background
in an interview with Complex in April 2020, Bourne stated that he was completing work on The Life of Pi'erre 5 and that it would be the final album in the series, saying, "My initial objective for this whole series was to get Kanye [West]'s attention, and I kind of got that while I was working on TLOP4. So I'm pretty much cool with what I've accomplished with it."

Critical reception

Dylan Green of Pitchfork said that Bourne continues to display his talents "as a producer first and a rapper second", but that lyrically "his jokes and scene-setting are typically colorful enough to infuse each rhyme with enough personality", concluding that "Bourne's consistent tinkering brings him closer to fully reconciling both sides of his art. If Pi'erre 5 proves anything, it's that Pi'erre Bourne the producer and Pi'erre Bourne the rapper are less at odds than ever." Kadish Morris of The Observer said that the album "is saturated with his idiosyncratic earworm tricks: mid-tempo wavy beats, inebriated syncopated synths and gloomy piano arrangements" but "the repetitive drone of his robotic vocals and disjointed storytelling can make the project feel laborious".

Track listing

Charts

References

2021 albums
Pi'erre Bourne albums
Interscope Records albums